Zeit genug is a German television series. It translates to 'Plenty of Time' in English.

External links
 

1982 German television series debuts
1982 German television series endings
Television shows set in Munich
German-language television shows
Das Erste original programming